"Branded Man" is a song written and recorded by American country music artist Merle Haggard and The Strangers.  It was released in July 1967 as the second single and title track from the album Branded Man.  The song was Haggard and The Strangers second number one on the country charts.  The single stayed at number one for a single week and spent 15 weeks on the chart.

Content
The song is about an ex-convict's fear of not being accepted by the outside world after being paroled.

Personnel
Merle Haggard– vocals, guitar

The Strangers:
Roy Nichols – guitar
Ralph Mooney – steel guitar
George French – piano
Jerry Ward – bass
Eddie Burris – drums

Chart performance

References

1967 singles
Merle Haggard songs
Songs written by Merle Haggard
Songs about prison
Song recordings produced by Ken Nelson (American record producer)
Capitol Records singles
1967 songs